Rocky Branch is a  long 2nd order tributary to the Deep River in Chatham County, North Carolina.

Course
Rocky Branch rises about 2 miles south of Pittsboro, North Carolina in Chatham County and then flows south to the Deep River about 1 mile northwest of Blacknel, North Carolina.

Watershed
Rocky Branch drains  of area, receives about 47.5 in/year of precipitation, and has a wetness index of 414.55 and is about 58% forested.

See also
List of rivers of North Carolina

References

Rivers of North Carolina
Rivers of Chatham County, North Carolina